Events in the year 1945 in Indonesia. The country had an estimated population of 68,517,300 people.

Incumbents
 President: Sukarno (from 18 August)
 Vice President: Mohammad Hatta (from 18 August)
 Prime Minister: Sutan Sjahrir (from 14 November)
 Chief Justice: Kusumah Atmaja (from 18 August)

Events
 8 July – Establishment of the Islamic University of Indonesia, in Sleman, Yogyakarta
 17 August – Proclamation of Indonesian Independence
 17 August – Start of the Indonesian National Revolution
 22 August – Launch of Voice of Indonesia
 August – Start of Bersiap
 2 September – Establishment of the Presidential Cabinet
 7 September – Disestablishment of Asia Raja newspaper
 11 September – Establishment of the Radio Republik Indonesia
 17 September – Establishment of the Indonesian Red Cross Society
 27 October – 20 November – Battle of Surabaya
 11 November – VP Mohammad Hatta issued the Vice-Presidential Edict No.X
 14 November – Disestablishment of the Presidential Cabinet
 14 November – Establishment of the office of Prime Minister of Indonesia
 November – Establishment of the First Sjahrir Cabinet

References

 
1940s in Indonesia
Years of the 20th century in Indonesia